Fort Crown Point was built by the combined efforts of both British and provincial troops (from New York and the New England Colonies) in North America in 1759 at a narrows on Lake Champlain on what later became the border between New York and Vermont. Erected to secure the region against the French, the fort is in upstate New York near the town of Crown Point and was the largest earthen fortress built in the United States. The fort's ruins, a National Historic Landmark, are now administered as part of Crown Point State Historic Site.

History
British forces targeted it twice during the French and Indian War before the French destroyed it in the summer of 1759.

The Crown Point fort was constructed by the British army under the command of Sir Jeffery Amherst following the capture of Carillon, a French fort to the south (which he renamed Ticonderoga) and the destruction of Fort St. Frédéric.  Amherst used the construction of the fort as a means of keeping his men working through the winter of 1759 after pushing the French into modern Canada.  Israel Putnam, who would later become a major general in the American Revolution, supervised much of the construction.  According to archaeologist David R. Starbuck, Crown Point was "the greatest British military installation ever raised in North America."

The fort was never directly assaulted.  Mostly built after the threat of French invasion had ended, it was used largely for staging rather than as a position in its own right. On April 21, 1773, a chimney fire broke out in the soldier's barracks. It quickly spread, burning for days. In May 1774, British military engineer John Montresor described the fort (post fire) with the following words: "the conflagration of the late fort has rendered it an amazing useless mass of earth only". Montresor proposed expanding and improving one of the outworks rather than attempting to repair the main fort.

After the French and Indian War, the British left a skeletal force at the fort. They quickly yielded to Capt. Seth Warner and 100 Green Mountain Boys, a Patriot American militia, on May 12, 1775 in the battle of Crown Point at the start of the Revolutionary War.  The Americans captured 111 cannons from the British at Crown Point, and transported 29 to Boston for the defense of Boston Harbor.

The fort was used as a staging ground by Benedict Arnold during the Revolution for his navy on Lake Champlain.  After the destruction of that navy in 1776 during the Battle of Valcour Island, the fort was abandoned to the British in 1777 after the failure of the patriot Invasion of Canada.  In 1780 the British abandoned the fort and, following their success in the Revolution, the United States had no need for it, so left it to deteriorate.

The large earthen walls of the Fort are still visible today in the 21st century. The fire of April 1773 had entirely destroyed the log and earth fortress. The stone ruins of two barracks buildings at the site are being preserved.

The fort was declared a National Historic Landmark in 1968.

Visits by Founding Fathers

Benjamin Franklin, traveling to Canada, seeking an alliance against the British
George Washington, July 21, 1783, the farthest north he ever traveled
Future Presidents Thomas Jefferson and James Madison in 1791

Gallery

See also 
List of National Historic Landmarks in New York
National Register of Historic Places listings in Essex County, New York

References

External links 

 Crown Point State Historic Site at NYS OPRHP

Government buildings completed in 1759
Infrastructure completed in 1759
Forts in New York (state)
Crown
Military history of Canada
National Historic Landmarks in New York (state)
New York (state) historic sites
Ruins in the United States
Crown
Crown
Museums in Essex County, New York
Parks in Essex County, New York
Military and war museums in New York (state)
American Revolutionary War museums in New York (state)
Crown
1759 establishments in the Province of New York
National Register of Historic Places in Essex County, New York
American Revolution on the National Register of Historic Places